Miguel Enrique Parrales Vera (born 26 December 1995) is an Ecuadorian footballer.

Career

For the second half of 2013/14, Parrales signed for the reserves of Spanish La Liga side Villareal from Independiente del Valle in the Ecuadorian top flight.

In 2015, he signed for the reserves of Mexican top flight club Cruz Azul from Portoviejo in the Ecuadorian second division.

References

External links
 Miguel Parrales at Soccerway

Ecuadorian footballers
Living people
1995 births
Association football forwards
Ecuador under-20 international footballers
C.S.D. Independiente del Valle footballers
People from Portoviejo
Villarreal CF B players
C.D. El Nacional footballers
Manta F.C. footballers
C.D. Universidad Católica del Ecuador footballers
Guayaquil City F.C. footballers
Ecuadorian expatriate footballers
Ecuadorian expatriate sportspeople in Spain
Expatriate footballers in Spain
Ecuadorian Serie A players
Ecuadorian Serie B players
Segunda División B players